The 42nd World Science Fiction Convention (Worldcon), also known as L.A.con II, was held on 30 August–3 September 1984 at the Anaheim Hilton and the Anaheim Convention Center in Anaheim, California, United States.

The chairmen were Craig Miller and Milt Stevens.

Participants 

Attendance was 8,365, the record .

Guests of Honor 

 Gordon R. Dickson (pro)
 Dick Eney (fan)
 Robert Bloch (toastmaster for the Hugo ceremony)
 Jerry Pournelle (Master of Ceremonies for the Other Awards ceremony)

Other notable participants 

A.E. Van Vogt attended the convention.

Robert Heinlein appeared, continuing his campaign to encourage science fiction fans to make blood donations.

Awards

1984 Hugo Awards 

 Best Novel: Startide Rising by David Brin
 Best Novella: "Cascade Point" by Timothy Zahn
 Best Novelette: "Blood Music" by Greg Bear
 Best Short Story: "Speech Sounds" by Octavia Butler
 Best Non-Fiction Book: Encyclopedia of Science Fiction and Fantasy, vol. III, by Donald Tuck
 Best Dramatic Presentation: Return of the Jedi
 Best Professional Editor: Shawna McCarthy
 Best Professional Artist: Michael Whelan
 Best Semiprozine: Locus, by Charles N. Brown
 Best Fanzine: File 770, edited by Mike Glyer
 Best Fan Writer: Mike Glyer
 Best Fan Artist: Alexis Gilliland

Other awards 

 John W. Campbell Award for Best New Writer: R. A. MacAvoy
 Special Award:
 Larry T. Shaw for lifetime achievement as a science fiction editor
 Robert Bloch for fifty years as a science fiction professional

See also 

 Hugo Award
 Science fiction
 Speculative fiction
 World Science Fiction Society
 Worldcon

References

External links 

 NESFA.org: The Long List
 NESFA.org: 1984 convention notes 

1984 conferences
1984 in California
1984 in the United States
Science fiction conventions in the United States
Worldcon